Gi Ja-o or Ki Ja-oh (1266–1328) was a Goryeo general and nobleman who is known for being the father of Empress Gi, the primary empress of Toghon Temür (Emperor Huizong) of the Yuan dynasty. He was stationed as a commander in Inju (present-day Incheon). During Empress Gi's regency in Yuan, he was granted the title of prince. Through Empress Gi, he eventually became the maternal grandfather of Biligtü Khan (Emperor Zhaozong) of the Northern Yuan dynasty.

Family 
Parents
Father: Gi-Gwan (기관)
Grandfather: Gi Hong-yeong (기홍영)
Grandmother: Princess Consort, of the Jangheung Im clan  (군부인 장흥임씨), daughter of Im Gyeong-sun (임경순)
Mother: Princess Consort Yeonheung, of the Juksan Park clan (연흥군부인 죽산박씨)
Consorts and their respective issue(s):
Grand Lady Samhangug,  of the Iksan Yi clan  (삼한국대부인 익산이씨), Yi Haeng-geom (이행검)
Gi Sik (기식), first son 
Gi Gheol, Internal Prince Deokseong (기철 덕성부원군 ; d.1356), second son
Gi Won (기원), third son
Gi Ju (기주), fourth son
Gy Ryun (기륜), fifth son
Empress Gi , of the Haengju Gi clan (기황후 행주 기씨; 1315 –1369), first daughter
Son-in-law: Toghon Temür, 15th Khagan of te Mongol Emprire
Grandson: Biligtü Khan Ayushiridara, Emperor of Northern Yuan Dynasty

In popular culture 
 Portrayed by Kim Myung-soo in 2013–2014 MBC TV series Empress Ki.

References 

Gi Ja-oh on Encykorea .

1266 births
1328 deaths
Place of birth unknown
Place of death unknown
14th-century Korean people
Korean generals
Haengju Ki clan
13th-century Korean people